Choctaw County is a county located in the central part of the U.S. state of Mississippi. As of the 2020 census, the population was 8,246. Its northern border is the Big Black River, which flows southwest into the Mississippi River south of Vicksburg. The county seat is Ackerman. 

The county is named after the Choctaw tribe of Native Americans. They had long occupied this territory as their homeland before European exploration.  Under the Indian Removal Act of 1830, they were forced by the United States to cede their lands and to move west of the Mississippi River to what became Indian Territory (today's state of Oklahoma).

History
This was one of the first counties organized in central Mississippi after Indian Removal, and it was originally much larger in geography. As the population increased in the Territory, additional counties were organized. For instance, in 1874 Webster County was formed from some of this county, as were Montgomery and Grenada counties.

The first county seat was Greensboro, which was later assigned to the territory of Webster County and designated as its county seat. Eventually Walthall, Mississippi was designated as the county seat of that county, resulting in the decline and abandonment of Greensboro.

Geography
The Big Black River forms the county's northern border.

Adjacent counties
 Webster County, Mississippi - north
 Oktibbeha County, Mississippi - east
 Winston County, Mississippi - southeast
 Attala County, Mississippi - southwest
 Montgomery County, Mississippi - west

National protected areas
 Natchez Trace Parkway (part)
 Tombigbee National Forest (part)

Demographics
The adjacent table reflects major decreases in population from 1910 to 1920, and from 1940 to 1960. These were periods of the Great Migration from the South by African Americans, who first moved to jobs in industrial cities in the North and Midwest. In the 1940s and after, they moved to the West Coast for jobs in the rapidly growing defense industry. Farm work declined with mechanization of agriculture. But Black people also migrated to escape the violence and social repression of Mississippi, where they had been essentially disenfranchised since 1890 and lived under Jim Crow laws and the threat of violence; the state had a high rate of lynchings.

2020 census

As of the 2020 United States census, there were 8,246 people, 3,228 households, and 2,010 families residing in the county.

2010 census
As of the 2010 United States Census, there were 8,543 people living in the county. 68.1% were White, 30.2% African American, 0.3% Native American, 0.2% Asian, 0.1% Pacific Islander, 0.1% from some other race and 1.1% of two or more races. 1.4% were Hispanic or Latino of any race.

2000 census
As of the census of 2000, there were 9,758 people, 3,686 households, and 2,668 families living in the county.  The population density was 23 people per square mile (9/km2).  There were 4,249 housing units at an average density of 10 per square mile (4/km2).  The racial makeup of the county was 68.03% White, 30.68% Black or African American, 0.31% Native American, 0.13% Asian, 0.01% Pacific Islander, 0.42% from other races, and 0.42% from two or more races.  0.81% of the population were Hispanic or Latino of any race.

There were 3,686 households, out of which 32.60% had children under the age of 18 living with them, 53.30% were married couples living together, 14.60% had a female householder with no husband present, and 27.60% were non-families. 25.00% of all households were made up of individuals, and 12.20% had someone living alone who was 65 years of age or older.  The average household size was 2.56 and the average family size was 3.06.

In the county, the population was spread out, with 27.80% under the age of 18, 8.80% from 18 to 24, 24.90% from 25 to 44, 23.50% from 45 to 64, and 15.00% who were 65 years of age or older.  The median age was 37 years. For every 100 females there were 91.90 males.  For every 100 females age 18 and over, there were 88.40 males.

The median income for a household in the county was $27,020, and the median income for a family was $31,095. Males had a median income of $26,966 versus $17,798 for females. The per capita income for the county was $13,474.  About 17.70% of families and 24.70% of the population were below the poverty line, including 33.80% of those under age 18 and 21.30% of those age 65 or over.

Education

Primary and secondary schools
Choctaw County School District operates public schools, including Choctaw County High School, Ackerman Elementary, French Camp Elementary, and Weir Elementary.

French Camp Academy, which provides in-house private education in grades 7 through 12, is located in French Camp.

Colleges and universities
Colleges and universities within a  radius of the center of the county include:
 East Mississippi Community College (campuses in Columbus, Mayhew, and Scooba)
 Holmes Community College (campuses in Goodman and Grenada)
 Mississippi State University (Starkville)
 Mississippi University for Women (Columbus)

Communities

Towns
 Ackerman (county seat)
 French Camp
 Mathiston (mostly in Webster County)
 Weir

Unincorporated communities
 Bywy
 Chester
 Reform

Ghost towns
 Bankston
 Pigeon Roost

Notable people
 James Blackwood, American Gospel singer and one of the founding members of legendary Southern Gospel quartet The Blackwood Brothers.
 Turner Catledge, Managing editor of The New York Times from 1952 to 1964 and the paper's first executive editor.
 David A. Chandler, Former Associate Justice of the Supreme Court of Mississippi.
 James Plemon "J.P." Coleman 52nd Governor of Mississippi and a United States Circuit Judge of the United States Court of Appeals for the Fifth Circuit.
 Thomas Fulton, Former conductor of the New York Metropolitan Opera
 Dennis Johnson Fullback for Mississippi State University who played for the New York Giants and Buffalo Bills in the NFL.
 Kenneth Johnson, NFL defensive back for the Green Bay Packers
 Tony Kimbrough, Former professional football quarterback
 Raymond Edwin "Ray" Mabus Jr., 60th Governor of Mississippi and 75th United States Secretary of the Navy.
 Hoyt Ming, old-time fiddler.
 Alvin McKinley, NFL defensive tackle who played for the Carolina Panthers, Cleveland Browns, Denver Broncos and New Orleans Saints.
 Roy Oswalt, a major league pitcher for the Colorado Rockies, and his wife Nicole live in Weir.
 Cheryl Prewitt, Miss America 1980 and Miss Mississippi 1979
 Kristi M. Fondren, Author "Walking on the Wild Side: Long-Distance Hiking on the Appalachian Trail"

In popular culture
The song "Choctaw County Affair" from Carrie Underwood's 2015 album Storyteller is set in Choctaw County, Mississippi.

Politics

See also
 National Register of Historic Places listings in Choctaw County, Mississippi

References

External links
 Choctaw County Courthouse Pictures

 
Mississippi counties
Mississippi placenames of Native American origin
Counties of Appalachia
1833 establishments in Mississippi
Populated places established in 1833